The Friends' Ambulance Unit (FAU) was a volunteer ambulance service, founded by individual members of the British Religious Society of Friends (Quakers), in line with their Peace Testimony. The FAU operated from 1914–1919, 1939–1946 and 1946–1959 in 25 different countries around the world. It was independent of the Quakers' organisation and chiefly staffed by registered conscientious objectors.

History

First World War

The Unit was founded as The First Anglo-Belgian Ambulance Unit at the start of World War I in 1914 and later renamed the Friends' Ambulance Unit. Members were trained at Jordans, a hamlet in Buckinghamshire, that was  a centre for Quakerism. Altogether it sent over a thousand men to France, Belgium and Italy, where they worked on ambulance convoys and ambulance trains with the French and British armies. The FAU came under the jurisdiction of the British Red Cross Society. It was dissolved in 1919.

Second World War and aftermath
It was refounded by a committee of former members at the start of World War II in September 1939 with the establishment of a training camp at Manor Farm, Bristol Road, Northfield, Birmingham. More than 1,300 members were trained and went on to serve as ambulance drivers and medical orderlies in London during the Blitz, as well as overseas in Finland, Norway and Sweden (1940), the Middle East (1940–1943), Greece (1941, 1944–1946), China and Syria (1941–1946), India and Ethiopia (1942–1945), Italy (1943–1946), France, Belgium, Netherlands, Yugoslavia and Germany (1944–1946) and Austria (1945–1946). Its first female member was Angela Sinclair-Loutit, who joined in 1940 after her studies at Somerville College, Oxford were interrupted.

China Convoy
The Sino-Japanese War had led to deteriorating conditions in China and in 1941 agreement was reached for the FAU to deploy 40 volunteers to deliver medical aid (dubbed the "China Convoy"). At first, their job was to secure the delivery of supplies via the "Burma Road", the sole remaining route. When Burma fell to the Japanese in May 1942, the FAU volunteers escaped to India and China. They regrouped and took on the distribution of medical supplies delivered by "The Hump", the air transport route to Kunming. It is estimated that 80% of medical supplies to China were distributed by the FAU.

The FAU's role expanded and they provided a range medical treatments, preventative measures and training of Chinese medical personnel. This expanded further into the reconstruction of medical facilities, notably the hospital at Tengchong in 1944, and into agricultural improvements and training.

The activities in China were international, employing personnel, men and women, from Britain (the largest national group), China, United States, Canada, New Zealand and elsewhere. Around 200 foreigners took part, eight died and others had their health permanently damaged. About half of the recruits were Quakers but all had a commitment to pacifism and wished to deliver practical help.

Responsibility for the relief work in China was passed to the American Friends Service Committee in 1946.

Northern Europe
Two 12-man sections with eight vehicles, FAU Relief Sections Nos 1 and 2, landed at Arromanches, Normandy on 6 September 1944 from a tank landing craft. Attached to the British Army's civilian affairs branch, the FAU sections provided relief to civilians in Normandy. No 2 FAU was then posted to a newly liberated refugee camp at Leopoldsburg, Belgium, managing reception, registration, disinfection, catering, dormitories and departures.

In November 1944, in response to a request from 21st Army Group, a further five more sections were established and arrived in Europe at the end of 1944. One new member was Gerald Gardiner, who subsequently became Lord Chancellor in Harold Wilson's Labour Party government of 1964–1970.

After a period in Nijmegen, assisting local civilian medical organisations during Operation Market Garden, No 2 FAU cared for a colony of the mentally ill near Cleves in Germany which grew to a population of 25,000. By April, the main work had become the accommodation and care of displaced persons until they could return home.  No 2 FAU  was heavily involved with the care and support of inmates at the newly liberated Stalag X-B prisoner-of-war camp near Sandbostel, between Bremen and Hamburg in northern Germany in May 1945.

The FAU was wound up in 1946 and replaced by the Friends Ambulance Unit Post-War Service, which continued until 1959.

The work of the Friends' Ambulance Unit was referred to in the 1947 award of the Nobel Peace Prize to Quakers worldwide and accepted by the Friends Service Council and the American Friends Service Committee.

Purpose
The original trainees in the 1939 training camp issued a statement expressing their purpose:

We purpose to train ourselves as an efficient Unit to undertake ambulance and relief work in areas under both civilian and military control, and so, by working as a pacifist and civilian body where the need is greatest, to demonstrate the efficacy of co-operating to build up a new world rather than fighting to destroy the old.

While respecting the views of those pacifists who feel they cannot join an organization such as our own, we feel concerned among the bitterness and conflicting ideologies of the present situation to build up a record of goodwill and positive service, hoping that this will help to keep uppermost in men's minds those values which are so often forgotten in war and immediately afterwards.

People associated with the FAU

Sir Fulque Agnew, 10th Baronet (1900–1975), university administrator
Horace Alexander (1889–1989), barrister and advocate of international arbitration (ODNB entry)
Laurie Baker (1917–2007), architect
Chris Barber (1921–2012), chair of Oxfam
 John Henry Barlow (1855–1924)
 F. Ralph Barlow (1910–1980), General Manager, Bournville Village Trust (1945–1973). Son of John Henry Barlow. Led FAU units in China, India, South Africa, Ethiopia (1939–1944)
Frank Blackaby (1921–2000), economist and peace campaigner (ODNB entry)
Russell Brain, 1st Baron Brain (1895–1966), physician and medical administrator (ODNB entry)
Edgar Kenneth Brown, (1918–1965), architect
Sir John Bevan Braithwaite (1884–1973), stockbroker (ODNB entry)
Richard Bevan Braithwaite (1900–1990), philosopher (ODNB entry)
Laurence John Cadbury (1889–1982), chocolate and food manufacturer (ODNB entry)
Cecil John Cadoux (1883–1947), theologian (ODNB entry)
Demetrios Capetanakis (1912–1944), poet and literary critic (ODNB entry)
Sydney Carter (1915–2004), English poet, songwriter
St John Pettifor Catchpool (1890–1971), social worker (ODNB entry)
Selby Clewer (1917–2001), architect
Alan Clodd (1918–2002), publisher, book collector, and dealer
Stephen Pit Corder (1918–1990), university professor (ODNB entry)
Ralph Henry Carless Davis (1918–1991), historian
John Done
Christopher Prout Driver (1932–1997), journalist and writer on food  (ODNB entry)
Theodore Fox (1899–1989), medical editor (ODNB entry)
Gerald Gardiner, Baron Gardiner (1900–1990), Lord Chancellor from 1964 to 1970
Roland Johnston Harris (1919–1969), schoolteacher, university lecturer, and poet
Ruth Harrison (1920–2000), animal welfare campaigner (ODNB entry)
W. F. Harvey (1885–1937), writer of short stories
F. R. G. Heaf (1894–1973), physician (ODNB entry)
John Hick (1922–2012), philosopher of religion
Eric Holttum (1895–1990), botanist (ODNB entry)
Kenneth Hudson (1916–1999), industrial archaeologist and museologist (ODNB entry)
F. R. Leavis (1895–1978), literary critic
Frank Lees (1931–1999), chemical engineer
Kingsley Martin (1897–1969), journalist
David Elwyn Morris (1920-2015), Solicitor and Author of China Changed My Mind (Cassells, 1948)
Christopher Nevinson (1889–1946), artist
Henry Woodd Nevinson (1856–1941), social activist and journalist (ODNB entry)
George Newman (doctor) (1870–1948), public health physician
Donald Nicol (1923–2003), British Byzantinist
Philip Noel-Baker (1889–1982), politician, diplomat, academic
Wilfrid Noyce (1917–1962), mountaineer and writer (ODNB entry)
Robert Nye (1936 – ), writer
Lionel Penrose (1898–1972), physician (ODNB entry)
Roland Penrose (1900–1984), artist, writer, and exhibition organizer (ODNB entry)
Arthur Cecil Pigou (1877–1959), economist and mountaineer
John Rawlings Rees (1890–1969), psychiatrist (ODNB entry)
Lewis Fry Richardson (1881–1953), mathematician, physicist, meteorologist, psychologist
Michael Rowntree (1919–2007), a journalist and Chairman of Oxfam
George William Series (1920–1995), spectroscopist (ODNB entry)
Angela Sinclair-Loutit (1921–2016), social justice activist, pacifist and nurse
Olaf Stapledon (1886–1950), philosopher and author of science fiction
Peter Derek Strevens (1922–1989), linguistic scholar and applied linguist (ODNB entry)
Donald Swann (1923–1994), composer, musician and entertainer
Frederick Tattersfield (1881–1959), agricultural chemist (ODNB entry)
Lewis Edgar Waddilove (1914–2000), social reformer (ODNB entry)
Richard Wainwright (1918–2003), Liberal MP
John Seldon Whale (1896–1997), United Reformed church minister and theologian (ODNB entry)
Duncan Wood, Headed up China Convey, son of HG Wood below
Herbert George Wood (1879–1963), theologian and historian (ODNB entry)
 Maurice Woodhead, (1915-1974) electrical retailer
Geoffrey Winthrop Young (1876–1958), mountaineer, poet and educator

Records

Much archival material has survived and has been deposited at Friends House Library, Euston Road, London. The Library has produced Guides to the material:
Conscientious Objectors and the Peace Movement in Britain 1914–1945
Friends Ambulance Unit (1939–1959).

See also
Wartime Civilian Ambulance Organizations
American Ambulance Great Britain
American Ambulance Field Service
Hadfield-Spears Ambulance Unit
Conscientious objection
Conscientious objector#United Kingdom
Conscientious objection throughout the world#Conscientious objection in Britain
Military Service Act (United Kingdom)

References

Bibliography
  
 
 
 
 
McClelland, Grigor, Embers of War: Letters from a Relief Worker in the British Zone of Germany, 1945-46 (1997) London, Bloomsbury Academic. 
FAU films: The Unit (Stephen Peet, 1941); Friends Ambulance Unit (1939-1946) (Stephen Peet, 1943-1946).
FAU journal The Chronicle 1939-1946.

External links
 Records of First World War personnel of the Friends Ambulance Unit  are searchable at http://fau.quaker.org.uk/search-view
Quakers and World War I 
Friends House Library 
Quaker Strongrooms - A blog from the Library of the Society of Friends 
Quaker Service Memorial Trust 
 Olaf Stapledon's experiences in WW I 
David Elwyn Morris' experience of FAU China Convoy - China Changed my Mind.

 
Defunct ambulance services in England
Quaker organizations
Peace organizations
World War I
World War II non-governmental organizations
Quakerism in the United Kingdom
Military medicine in World War I
Military medicine in World War II
International Red Cross and Red Crescent Movement